The NWA International Heavyweight Championship was a singles title recognized by the National Wrestling Alliance through its partnership with the Japan Pro Wrestling Alliance, and later by All Japan Pro Wrestling. It is one of the three titles that were unified into the Triple Crown Heavyweight Championship in 1989. From 1981 to the withdrawal of All Japan from the NWA in 1988, the National Wrestling Alliance considered the NWA International title to be its top singles championship in Japan. In 1983, Giant Baba would elevate the title even further in the eyes of many when he, as the reigning PWF Heavyweight Champion, declared Jumbo Tsuruta to be the new "Ace" of All Japan after Jumbo won the NWA International Heavyweight Championship from Bruiser Brody. Following the withdrawal of All Japan from the NWA, the International title was briefly sanctioned by the Pacific Wrestling Federation until the unification of the Triple Crown could be completed.

Under Rikidōzan the belt had a design similar to Lou Thesz's original NWA World Heavyweight Championship belt during the 1950s, but after Rikidōzan's death, the belt given to Giant Baba had the design seen on the belt part of the Triple Crown until 2013. The original design was later used on the PWF Heavyweight Championship, the UWFI belt (which was the original Lou Thesz belt), and a belt later given to Kazushi Sakuraba for show.

Title history

Combined reigns

See also
List of National Wrestling Alliance championships
Triple Crown Heavyweight Championship
WWF International Heavyweight Championship
WCW International World Heavyweight Championship
AWA International Heavyweight Championship
NWA United National Championship
PWF World Heavyweight Championship

Footnotes

References

External links
Wrestling-Titles.com

National Wrestling Alliance championships
All Japan Pro Wrestling championships
International professional wrestling championships
Heavyweight wrestling championships
Recurring sporting events established in 1957
Recurring events disestablished in 1988
NWA Hollywood Wrestling championships
Championship Wrestling from Florida championships
Japan Pro Wrestling Alliance championships